The Pakistan national cricket team toured South Africa during the 2002–03 season, playing five One Day Internationals (ODIs) and two Test matches, as well as four tour matches, between 3 December 2002 and 6 January 2003. South Africa won the ODI series 4–1, losing only the second match, and won both Tests after forcing Pakistan to follow on in both matches.

Squads

Batsman Gary Kirsten was added to the South Africa squad for the final two ODIs, while Neil McKenzie and Nicky Boje were dropped. After originally being named in the 15-man squad for the first Test, Monde Zondeki was released to play for Border in the Standard Bank Cup, South Africa's one-day cricket competition; he was recalled for the second Test.

ODI series

1st ODI

2nd ODI

3rd ODI

4th ODI

5th ODI

Test series

1st Test

2nd Test

Tour matches

One-day: Nicky Oppenheimer XI v Pakistanis

50-over: South Africa A v Pakistanis

25-over: Border Invitation XI v Pakistanis

Three-day: South Africa A v Pakistanis

References

External links
Tour home at ESPNcricinfo

2002 in Pakistani cricket
2003 in Pakistani cricket
International cricket competitions in 2002–03
2002-03
2002–03 South African cricket season
2002 in South African cricket
2003 in South African cricket